A Chapter in Her Life is a 1923 American drama film based on the novel Jewel: A Chapter in Her Life by Clara Louise Burnham. The film was directed by Lois Weber. She had previously adapted the same novel as the 1915 film Jewel, which she co-directed (uncredited) with her then-husband and collaborator Phillips Smalley. Weber made this film shortly after her divorce from Smalley.

Plot
Jewel (Mercer) is a young granddaughter who stays with her grizzled, angry grandfather while her parents are overseas on business. Anger and squabbling amongst the family are brought to heel through love, understanding and the teachings of Christian Science through Jewel's pure sweet love for others and trust in Divine Love.

Cast
 Claude Gillingwater as Mr. Everingham
 Jane Mercer as Jewel
 Jacqueline Gadsden as Eloise Everingham
 Frances Raymond as Madge Everingham
 Robert Frazer as  Dr. Ballard
 Eva Thatcher as Mrs. Forbes
 Ralph Yearsley as Zeke Forbes
 Fred Thomson as Nat Bonnell
 Beth Rayon as Susan

Preservation status
Prints of A Chapter in Her Life are held by the Cineteca Del Friuli, George Eastman House, Library of Congress and BFI National Film and Television Archive.

References

External links

Progressive Silent Film List: A Chapter in Her Life at silentera.com

1923 films
1923 drama films
Silent American drama films
American silent feature films
American black-and-white films
Films directed by Lois Weber
Films about dysfunctional families
Films based on American novels
Universal Pictures films
1920s American films